Bexfield is a village near Foulsham  in Norfolk, England.

Villages in Norfolk
Broadland